Kim Tân is a rural commune and capital of Ia Pa District, Gia Lai Province, Vietnam.

References

Populated places in Gia Lai province
District capitals in Vietnam
Communes of Gia Lai province